Ricky Miron Jones (born June 4, 1958) is a former professional baseball infielder. He played in Major League Baseball during the 1986 season for the Baltimore Orioles, appearing in 16 games as a second baseman and third baseman.

Sources

Major League Baseball infielders
Baltimore Orioles players
Bluefield Orioles players
Charlotte O's players
Rochester Red Wings players
Hagerstown Suns players
Portland Beavers players
Chipola Indians baseball players
Baseball players from Mississippi
1958 births
Living people
West Georgia Wolves baseball players